Gamoruna was a genus of moths in the family Geometridae. It is now considered a synonym of Alex.

References

Desmobathrinae